Peyrilles is a commune in the Lot department in south-western France.

Demographics
People living there are called Peyrillacois in French.

Places

See also
Communes of the Lot department

References

Communes of Lot (department)